The University District (commonly, the U District) is a major district in Seattle, Washington, comprising several distinct neighborhoods. The main campus of the University of Washington (UW) is located in the district, lending its name to both the district as well as University Way NE (commonly The Ave).

Location 
Like all Seattle neighborhoods, the boundaries of the University District are informal; by common usage, the University District is bounded on the west by Interstate 5; on the east by University Village and Union Bay; on the south by Portage Bay and the Lake Washington Ship Canal; and on the north by NE Ravenna Boulevard.

History 
What is now the University District has been inhabited since the end of the last glacial period (c. 8,000 BCE—10,000 years ago). The most recent Native American settlement in the area were the Duwamish villages of the Lushootseed (Skagit-Nisqually) Coast Salish peoples. The Duwamish had several prominent villages in and around the University District, including "SWAH-tsoo-gweel" ("portage") and "hehs-KWEE-kweel" ("skate)" on Union Bay. The Duwamish peoples living in this area were known as "hah-choo-AHBSH" (people of HAH-choo, meaning 'a large lake' and referring to present-day Lake Washington).

The Duwamish also had trails through the areas that connected the village sites with waterways and fire-managed (burned) areas. These areas were cleared by fire for hunting purposes and to promote good crop growth. Blackberries, salmonberries, and root crops were plentiful, along with game including wolves, cougar, bear, deer and elk. One trail found by early non-native surveyors of the area extended from Portage Bay to Lake Washington and connected two native encampments, one on Portage Bay near the foot of Brooklyn Ave and one on Union Bay. No remnants of the Native American use of the area are extant in the University District today. The area now occupied by University Village was at that time a much larger Union Bay prior to the artificial lowering of Lake Washington.

The district was first surveyed in 1855, and its first white settlers arrived 12 years later. In 1890, the district began to enter a growth phase, and the portion due west of the present University of Washington campus was laid out as the Brooklyn Addition. This land was owned by real estate developer James A. Moore, his wife, and the Clise Investment Company and included much of the original Brownfield homestead. This central area was called Brooklyn, which gave the current Brooklyn Avenue in the neighborhood its name.

Nielsen notes that the area was slower to develop than areas to the north and west such as Ravenna and Latona, due to those areas being more gently sloped and located closer to the central lakes (Union and Green Lakes). Materials for land/street development and improvements were hauled in by horse-drawn wagons. One year later (in 1891) much of the land north of the Ship Canal, including the future University District, was annexed by the City of Seattle.

In the early 1870s, coal was discovered east of Seattle in the Newcastle area near Bellevue. The coal was transported across Lake Washington to Union Bay, and initially was portaged across Montlake to eventually reach Elliott Bay. After around 1888, the Seattle Lake Shore and Eastern Railway was built and ran along tracks which now form the Burke–Gilman Trail, a major bike commuting and recreation path across North Seattle.

Below, an 1894 report describes a train wreck just west of the current University District in the Latona neighborhood (now located west of I-5).

August 20, 1894. Wreck on [the] Seattle, Lake Shore and Eastern just west of Latone [now Latona Avenue]. Freight train from Gilman [now Snoqualmie] hit a cow.  [Trainload was a] [m]ixer freight train, 10 co[a]l cars, logs and box cars. Train had slowed down at Brooklyn [Avenue] for cows. Engineer saw cows on a bank beyond Latona looking (?) one another[!]. One cow was tossed over [the] bank and hit the track just as [the] engine came by.  [The] [e]ngine was raised off the track[,] and when it came down [the] wheels went off the rails. Engineer reversed but [it] was too late.  [The] [c]oal tender shot ahead[,] tearing part of [the engine] car [(cab)] off and decapitating [the] fireman and killing [the] brakeman. Engineer and coal passer [were] unhurt. Steam and dust enveloped the derailed cars. Engineer ran to Fremont to telegraph to stop [the] evening passenger train[;] also [illegible] Engineer claimed train going 20 miles per hr.

The old neighborhood name "Brooklyn" began to fade around this time. Electric trolley tracks had been laid up Columbus Avenue (later known as 14th Avenue, and later still University Way) either in 1891 or 1892, and the neighborhood soon began to be called "University Station" after the heated waiting house at the corner of what is now NE 42nd Street. The street cars eventually came to be operated by the Seattle Municipal Street Railway, which ceased operations in 1941.

The University of Washington relocated to the U District in 1895, leaving its previous location in the Metropolitan Tract in downtown Seattle. Much of the U District was still clear cut forest or stump farmland.

As a result of a contest held by the University Commercial Club in 1919, 14th Avenue (by then already known as "The Avenue" or "The Ave") was renamed University Way, and the neighborhood was renamed the University District. An alternative proposal was to rename the area "UniverCity," in recognition of the urban feel of the district and the major commercial presence along its main streets.

Neighborhoods 
The City of Seattle does not publish an official neighborhood map, and many neighborhood boundaries in Seattle are somewhat informal.

Neighborhoods within the district include:
 University Park (east from 15th to 25th Avenues NE, north from NE 50th Street to NE Ravenna Boulevard)
 Greek Row (NE 45th to NE 50th Streets, 15th to 22nd Avenues NE)
 University Heights (north of NE 45th Street and west of 15th Avenue NE)
 Brooklyn Addition (west of 15th Avenue NE and south of NE 45th Street)
 University Village (east of 25th Avenue NE)
 Main, West, and South campuses of the University of Washington, including the University of Washington Medical Center

Infrastructure

Public Transit 
The district is served by two Link light rail stations: University of Washington Station near Husky Stadium opened in 2016 as part of the University Link Extension; and U District on Brooklyn Avenue near NE 45th Street which opened in October 2021 as part of the Northgate Link Extension. Light rail service connects the U District to Capitol Hill and Downtown Seattle to the south, and Roosevelt and Northgate to the north.

Streets 
The neighborhood's north-south arterials are (from west to east) Roosevelt Way NE (southbound only), 11th Avenue NE (northbound only), Brooklyn Avenue NE, University Way NE, and 15th Avenue NE. East-west arterials include NE Pacific Street, NE 45th Street, and part of NE 50th Streets. NE Campus Parkway is a minor east-west arterial, running only west of the campus.

Upzoning and Urban Development 
The district's skyline was formerly defined primarily by the UW campus, UW Tower, and the art deco style Graduate Hotel Seattle (originally the Meany Hotel).

More recently, the U District has entered a new period of growth and several residential and office towers have recently been constructed, and several more are under construction and proposed.

Culture 

In 1970, local merchant and dedicated peace activist Andy Shiga was instrumental in starting the U District Street Fair. The U District Partnership describes the history of the festival as follows:

The Blue Moon Tavern has become an unofficial cultural landmark and was founded in 1934. The Grand Illusion Cinema (founded in a former dental lab in 1968 by Randy Finley, now owned and run by dedicated volunteers); and the (locally-owned) Scarecrow Video, the largest video store on the West Coast, further characterize the neighborhood.

See also 
The Ave
Last Exit on Brooklyn
University Book Store

Notes

References 

  and 
 
   Crowley here is citing his own Forever Blue Moon, The Story of Seattle's Most (In)Famous Tavern, Seattle: Blue Moon, 1992.
   Page links to Village Descriptions Duwamish-Seattle section.
   John Moe interview with Guerren Marter, Grand Illusion Cinema manager.
 
   Compiled, designed, drafted in cooperation between Physical Plant and the Department of Geography, August 1971, revised Sherman (August 1991).

External links 

Seattle City Clerk's Neighborhood Map Atlas — University District
University Chamber of Commerce website
Seattle Photograph Collection, University District – University of Washington Digital Collection
University Village website 

 
Academic enclaves
Student quarters